Madeline Zuluaga (born 1993) is an American illustrator/storyteller. She is currently based in New York City.

Education 

She attended the School of Visual Arts and graduated with a BFA in illustration in 2016.

Career

Much of Zuluaga's work revolves around watercolor, capybaras, and vegetables. She was inspired by her own mother’s immigration story and the New York City immigrant community to create her comic Capybara Ferry. The story discusses the emigration of a turnip girl and turnip family. Zuluaga is a featured illustrator in Chapter 7 of the book When the Rules Aren’t Right: 7 Time Travel Tales of Activism.

In 2017 Zuluaga's work was also included Mine!, a comic collection to benefit Planned Parenthood that included works by Neil Gaiman, Gail Simone, and Gerard Way.

Personal life 

Zuluaga is named after Madeline from the children’s books of the same name by Ludwig Bemelmans at the request of her sister. It wasn't until the end of her college career that Zuluaga came to the realization that she wanted to be a storyteller.

Bibliography

Comics 
 As writer/artist

Capybara Ferry
Wings

Publications 

 Mythology Anthology curated by illustrator Stephanie Hovden (2015)
 School of Visual Art's Illustration Portfolio 37 (2016)
When the Rules Aren't Right: 7 Time Travel Tales of Activism Graphic Novel (2016)
New Frontiers: The Many Worlds of George Takei Anthology (2017)

References

External links
Madeline's Official Website
Cartoonists of Color Database

1993 births
Living people
American women illustrators
American illustrators
21st-century American women